Esmeralda Falcón Reyes (born 10 January 1995), nicknamed La Pantera, is a Mexican boxer. She is the first woman from her country to compete in that discipline in the Olympic Games.

Personal life
Falcón was born in the Iztapalapa borough of Mexico City. Along with her sporting career, she is pursuing a degree in physical education.

Career
At the 2018 Central American and Caribbean Games, Falcón defeated Elisa Williams of Panama in the 60 kilogram division, winning a gold medal.  At the 2019 Pan American Games, she won the bronze medal after defeating Scarleth Ojeda of Nicaragua. 

For the Tokyo 2020 Olympic Games qualification, Falcón trained at home due to the COVID-19 pandemic. The elimination for the Olympic competition would have been held in Buenos Aires from 23 March to 3 April, but it was cancelled due to the health emergency. On 12 May 2021, the Mexican Boxing Federation announced its selection for the Olympic fair by the Boxing Task Force, becoming the first Mexican woman to compete in boxing in her country's Olympic history.

References

External links
 

1995 births
Living people
Boxers from Mexico City
Mexican women boxers
Olympic boxers of Mexico
Boxers at the 2020 Summer Olympics
Medalists at the 2019 Pan American Games
Pan American Games medalists in boxing
Pan American Games bronze medalists for Mexico
Boxers at the 2019 Pan American Games
Competitors at the 2018 Central American and Caribbean Games
Central American and Caribbean Games medalists in boxing
Central American and Caribbean Games gold medalists for Mexico
Lightweight boxers
21st-century Mexican women